The Duchy of Savoy was a country in Western Europe that existed from 1416 until 1860.

It was created when Sigismund, Holy Roman Emperor, raised the County of Savoy into a duchy for Amadeus VIII. The duchy was an Imperial fief, subject of the Holy Roman Empire, until 1792, with a vote in the Imperial Diet. From the 16th century, Savoy belonged to the Upper Rhenish Circle. 

Its territory included the current French departments of Savoy, Haute-Savoie and the Alpes-Maritimes, the current Italian region of Aosta Valley, a large part of Piedmont and the County of Geneva in Switzerland, which was then lost to the Old Swiss Confederacy.

Throughout its history, it was ruled by the House of Savoy and formed a part of the larger Savoyard state, which in 1720 became known as the Kingdom of Sardinia (also called "Kingdom of Savoy-Sardinia").

The main Vulgar languages that were spoken within the Duchy of Savoy were Piedmontese and Arpitan.

History

15th century
The Duchy was created in 1416 when Sigismund, Holy Roman Emperor (1433–1437) awarded the title of "Duke" to Count Amadeus VIII.

Being landlocked at its conception in 1388, the then-County of Savoy acquired a few kilometres of coastline around Nice. Other than this expansion, the 14th century was generally a time of stagnation. Pressure from neighboring powers, particularly France, prevented development, which characterizes the rest of the Renaissance era for Savoy.

The reign of Amadeus VIII was a turning point for the economy and the policy of the state, which deeply marked the history of the nation. His long reign was highlighted by wars (the country expanded its territory by defeating the Duchy of Monferrato and Lordship of Saluzzo), as well as reforms and edicts, and also some controversial actions. The first was in 1434, when he chose to withdraw to the Château de Ripaille, where, living the life of a hermit, he founded the Order of St. Maurice. In 1439, he received an appointment as antipope, which he accepted (under the name of Felix V), although he subsequently resigned a decade later out of a fear of undermining the religious unity of Christians.

The second important action of the Government of Amadeo VIII was the creation of the Principality of Piedmont in August 1424, the management of which was entrusted to the firstborn of the family as a title of honor. The duke left the territory largely formed from the old Savoy domain.

As a cultured and refined man, Duke Amadeus gave great importance to art. Among others, he worked with the famous Giacomo Jaquerio in literature and architecture, encouraging the cultivation of the arts in the Italian Piedmont.

However, his first son Amedeo died prematurely in 1431 and was succeeded by his second son Louis. Louis was in turn succeeded by the weak Amadeus IX, who was extremely religious (he was eventually declared blessed), but of little practical power, to the point that he allowed his wife, Yolande (Violante) of Valois, sister of Louis XI, to make very important decisions. During this period, France was more or less free to control the affairs of Savoy, which bound Savoy to the crown in Paris.

The Duchy's economy suffered during these years, not only because of war, but also because of the poor administration by Violante and the continued donations by Amadeus IX to the poor of Vercelli. The future of the nation was entrusted to the hands of a boy, Philibert I, who died at the early age of seventeen, after reigning for ten years. He was succeeded by Charles I, who died aged 21, and Charles II, who died aged 6. As a consequence of its participation in the Burgundian Wars, Savoy lost all its possessions north and south-east of Lake Geneva to the Swiss Confederacy.

16th century
When Philibert II died in 1504, he was succeeded by Charles III the Good, a rather weak ruler. Since 1515, Savoy had been occupied by foreign armies, and Francis I of France was just waiting for the opportunity to permanently annex Savoy and its possessions. In 1536, Francis I ordered the occupation of the Duchy, which was invaded by a strong military contingent. Charles III realized too late the weakness of the state, and tried to defend the city of Turin. However, the city was lost on 3 April of the same year. Charles III retired in Vercelli, trying to continue the fight, but never saw the state free from occupation.

Emmanuel Philibert was the Duke who more than any other influenced the future policy of Savoy, managing to put an end to the more than twenty-year long occupation. The Peace of Cateau-Cambrésis, signed in 1559, restored full autonomy to the duchy, with his marriage to Margaret of France.

Emmanuel Philibert realized that Savoy could no longer trust France. He thereforemoved the capital to Turin, which he protected with a complex system of fortifications known as the Cittadella (remnants of the Citadalla can still can be seen, although it was largely destroyed by the subsequent expansion of the city). From his military experience in Flanders, Emmanuel Philibert learned how to run an army, having won the famous Battle of St. Quentin. He was the first Duke of Savoy to establish a stable military apparatus that was not composed of mercenaries but rather by specially trained Savoyan soldiers.

His son, Charles Emmanuel I, extended the duchy to the detriment of the lordships of Monferrato and the territory of Saluzzo, previously ceded to France, in 1601 under the Treaty of Lyon. Unfortunately, the wars of Charles Emmanuel ended mostly in defeats. Nevertheless, he is remembered as "Charles the Great", since he was a versatile and cultured man, a poet and a skillful reformer. He was able to manage the Duchy at a time of severe crisis vis-a-vis the European powers and found support from the Habsburgs. The policy of Charles Emmanuel was in fact based more on actions of international warfare, such as the possessions of the Marquis of Saluzzo, and the wars of succession in the duchies of Mantua and Monferrato. Generally, Savoy sided with Spain, but on occasion allied with France (as, for example, the Treaty of Susa required).

17th century

During the seventeenth century, the influence of the court of Versailles put pressure on Savoy. Due to the proximity of the Duchy of Milan, troops were stationed in France, and the disposal of Pinerolo (one of the most important strongholds of Savoy), were situated close to Turin. The court, which had been under Spanish influence with Charles Emmanuel I, became oriented towards France under his three successors. Vittorio Amedeo I (in office 1630–1637) had married Madame Royale, Maria Christina of Bourbon-France in 1619. Cristina held the real power in Savoy during the short period of the child-duke Francis Hyacinth (reigned 1637–1638) and during the minority (1638-1648) of Charles Emmanuel II.

During the Thirty Years' War, Savoy was one of the states of the Holy Roman Empire that largely sided with France and against both the Emperor and Spain. Savoyard troops participated on the side of the French in the Savoyard-Genoese War, the War of the Mantuan Succession, the Tornavento campaign and, in part, in the Piedmontese Civil War, among other places.

The strong French influence, plus various misfortunes, repeatedly hit Savoy following the death of Charles Emmanuel I (26 July 1630). First of all, the plague ran rampant in 1630 and contributed significantly to the already widespread poverty.

The Wars of Succession of Monferrato (1628–1631) were very bloody in the countryside and subjected Casale Monferrato to a long siege (1629). Developments of arms and politics affected the economy and future history, exacerbating the already difficult situation after the death of Victor Amadeus I in 1637. He was succeeded for a short period of time by his eldest surviving son, the 5-year-old Francis Hyacinth. The post of regent for the next-oldest son, Carlo Emanuele II, also went to his mother Christine Marie of France, whose followers became known as madamisti (supporters of Madama Reale). Because of this, Savoy became a satellite state of the regent's brother, King Louis XIII of France. The supporters of Cardinal Prince Maurice of Savoy and Thomas Francis, Prince of Carignano (both sons of Charles Emmanuel I), together with their followers, took the name of principisti (supporters of the Princes).

Each warring faction soon besieged the city of Turin. The principisti made early gains, making Turin subject to great looting on 27 July 1639. Only in 1642 did the two factions reach an agreement; by now, the widow of Victor Amadeus I had placed Victor's son Charles Emmanuel II on the throne and ruled as regent in his place, even past the child's age of majority.

A resurgence of religious wars took place during the regency. Subsequently, in 1655, Savoyard troops massacred large numbers of the Protestant population of the Waldensian valleys, an event known as the Piedmontese Easter. Eventually international pressure stopped the massacres. A final agreement with the Waldensians was carried out in 1664.

The government of Charles Emmanuel II was the first step towards major reforms carried out by his successor Victor Amadeus II in the next century. Of particular importance were the founding of militias in Savoy and the establishment of the first public school-system in 1661. A cultured man, but also a great statesman, Charles Emmanuel imitated Louis XIV. He wanted to limit this to the court in the sumptuous palace of Venaria Reale, a masterpiece of Baroque architecture, and a copy recreated in Italy of the magnificence of the Palace of Versailles. It was a time of great urban expansion, and Charles Emmanuel II promoted the growth of Turin and its reconstruction in the baroque style. After his death in 1675, there followed the period of the regency (1675-1684) of his widow, the new Madama Reale, Maria Giovanna Battista of Savoy-Nemours.

From duchy to kingdom
Charles Emmanuel II was succeeded by his 11-year-old son, Victor Amadeus II of Savoy; his mother, the French born Marie Jeanne Baptiste of Savoy-Nemours was regent. Marie Jeanne sought to marry her son to the daughter and heir presumptive of King Peter II of Portugal. This could have led to Savoy becoming a possession of a foreign power.

After Victor Amadeus II assumed power, Savoy became hostile to France, which invaded in the Nine Years' War. Savoy defeated the French in the Siege of Cuneo (1691), but was dramatically defeated in the battles of Staffarda and Marsaglia. Savoy became a French satellite, and Victor Amadeus II married Anne Marie d'Orléans, niece of King Louis XIV of France.

Savoy remained a French ally during the first phase of the War of the Spanish Succession, but changed sides later. France invaded again, and Savoy was saved by Austrian troops led by the duke's cousin, Prince Eugene of Savoy.

At the end of the war in 1713, Victor Amadeus II received the Kingdom of Sicily. By the Treaty of London (1718), Victor Amadeus II exchanged Sicily for Sardinia in 1720. Sardinia then became the Kingdom of Sardinia. The various dominions held in personal union by Victor Amadeus II included Sardinia, Savoy, Piedmont, Aosta Valley, Nice, and Oneglia. The collection was usually referred to as "Sardinia", meaning the kingdom.

After the French Revolution, Savoy was invaded by the French Revolutionary Army in 1792 and annexed to France. Savoy was first incorporated as the department of Mont-Blanc; then, in 1798, it was divided between the departments of Mont-Blanc and Léman. Savoy, Piedmont, and Nice were restored to the House of Savoy at the Congress of Vienna in 1814–1815.

Under the terms of the Treaty of Turin (1860), the region of Savoy and the County of Nice were annexed by France. The last Duke of Savoy became King Victor Emmanuel II of Italy.

Army
The duchy was a notable regional military power, often getting involved in wars between the French and Habsburgs. In the 17th century, peacetime strength tended to hover around 4,800 professional soldiers (3,600 infantry and 1,200 cavalry), with a large peasant militia. In times of war, militiamen were trained and impressed and mercenaries were hired, and the size of the army quickly rose. In 1625, the duchy had an army of 26,600 regulars (25,381 infantry and 1,213 cavalry), plus about 8,000 militia. The regulars consisted of 5 to 7 regiments of Piedmontese, with mercenaries comprising the rest, including 9 regiments of French and 2 regiments of Italians. In 1635 the regular army was down to 12,250, then 15,710 in 1637, 18,000 in 1649, then 5,500 in the peacetime year of 1660, then 26,178 in 1672, and 35,000 in 1705 (with 10,000 militia called up to bolster them and more uncalled).Gregory Hanlon, "Twilight of a Military Tradition", London 1998, p. 106.

The militia was relatively well-armed and consisted of 24,000 men in 1566, of whom about a third could be used outside of their immediate district.

List of Dukes of Savoy
Amadeus VIII: 1391–1440, duke from 1416
Louis: 1440–65
Amadeus IX: 1465–72
Philibert I: 1472–82
Charles I: 1482–90, first titular King of Cyprus, Jerusalem and Armenia of the House of Savoy
Charles (II) John Amadeus: 1490–96
Philip II: 1496–97
Philibert II: 1497–1504
Charles III: 1504–53
Emmanuel Philibert: 1553–80
Charles Emmanuel I: 1580–1630
Victor Amadeus I: 1630–37
Francis Hyacinth: 1637–38
Charles Emmanuel II: 1638–75
Victor Amadeus II: 1675–1730, King of Sicily 1713–1720, then King of Sardinia
Charles Emmanuel III: 1730–1773
Victor Amadeus III: 1773–1796
Charles Emmanuel IV: 1796–1802
Victor Emmanuel I: 1802–1821
Charles Felix of Sardinia: 1821–1831
Charles Albert of Sardinia: 1831–1849
Victor Emmanuel II: 1849–1861 (last)

Flag
The flag of Savoy is a white cross on a red field. It is based on a crusader flag, and as such is identical in origin to the flag of the Knights of Malta (whence the modern Flag of Malta and of the Sovereign Military Order of Malta), and others (flags of Denmark and Switzerland, with inverted colors to those of England and Genoa, among others).
It was possibly first used by Amadeus III, Count of Savoy, who went on the Second Crusade in 1147.
In the 18th century, the letters "FERT" were sometimes added in the cantons to distinguish the flag from the Maltese one.

Notes
 When the Duchy of Savoy acquired Sicily in 1713 and later Sardinia in 1720, the title of "Duke of Savoy", while remaining a primary title, became a lesser title to the title of King. The Duchy of Savoy remained as a state of the new country until the provincial reform of King Charles Albert, at which point the kingdom became a unitary state.

References

Sources
 
 
 

 
Savoy
History of Piedmont
History of Turin
Upper Rhenish Circle
States and territories established in 1416
States and territories disestablished in 1713
1410s establishments in the Holy Roman Empire
1416 establishments in Europe
1710s disestablishments in the Holy Roman Empire
1713 disestablishments in Italy
Kingdom of Sardinia
History of Aosta Valley
Former monarchies of Europe